A multilayer perceptron (MLP) is a fully connected class of feedforward artificial neural network (ANN). The term MLP is used ambiguously, sometimes loosely to mean any feedforward ANN, sometimes strictly to refer to networks composed of multiple layers of perceptrons (with threshold activation); see . Multilayer perceptrons are sometimes colloquially referred to as "vanilla" neural networks, especially when they have a single hidden layer.

An MLP consists of at least three layers of nodes: an input layer, a hidden layer and an output layer. Except for the input nodes, each node is a neuron that uses a nonlinear activation function. MLP utilizes a supervised learning technique called backpropagation for training. Its multiple layers and non-linear activation distinguish MLP from a linear perceptron. It can distinguish data that is not linearly separable.

Theory

Activation function 
If a multilayer perceptron has a linear activation function in all neurons, that is, a linear function that maps the weighted inputs to the output of each neuron, then linear algebra shows that any number of layers can be reduced to a two-layer input-output model. In MLPs some neurons use a nonlinear activation function that was developed to model the frequency of action potentials, or firing, of biological neurons.

The two historically common activation functions are both sigmoids, and are described by

.

The first is a hyperbolic tangent that ranges from -1 to 1, while the other is the logistic function, which is similar in shape but ranges from 0 to 1. Alternative activation functions have been proposed, including the rectifier and softplus functions. More specialized activation functions include radial basis functions (used in radial basis networks, another class of supervised neural network models).

In recent developments of deep learning the rectified linear unit (ReLU) is more frequently used as one of the possible ways to overcome the numerical problems related to the sigmoids.

Layers 

The MLP consists of three or more layers (an input and an output layer with one or more hidden layers) of nonlinearly-activating nodes. Since MLPs are fully connected, each node in one layer connects with a certain weight  to every node in the following layer.

Learning  
Learning occurs in the perceptron by changing connection weights after each piece of data is processed, based on the amount of error in the output compared to the expected result. This is an example of supervised learning, and is carried out through backpropagation, a generalization of the least mean squares algorithm in the linear perceptron.

The node weights can then be adjusted based on corrections that minimize the error in the entire output for the th data point, given by

.

Using gradient descent, the change in each weight  is

In the previous expression,  denotes the partial derivate of the error  according to the weighted sum  of the input connections of neuron .

The derivative to be calculated depends on the induced local field , which itself varies. It is easy to prove that for an output node this derivative can be simplified to

where  is the derivative of the activation function described above, which itself does not vary. The analysis is more difficult for the change in weights to a hidden node, but it can be shown that the relevant derivative is

.

This depends on the change in weights of the th nodes, which represent the output layer. So to change the hidden layer weights, the output layer weights change according to the derivative of the activation function, and so this algorithm represents a backpropagation of the activation function.

Terminology 

The term "multilayer perceptron" does not refer to a single perceptron that has multiple layers. Rather, it contains many perceptrons that are organized into layers. An alternative is "multilayer perceptron network". Moreover, MLP "perceptrons" are not perceptrons in the strictest possible sense. True perceptrons are formally a special case of artificial neurons that use a threshold activation function such as the Heaviside step function. MLP perceptrons can employ arbitrary activation functions. A true perceptron performs binary classification, an MLP neuron is free to either perform classification or regression, depending upon its activation function.

The term "multilayer perceptron" later was applied without respect to nature of the nodes/layers, which can be composed of arbitrarily defined artificial neurons, and not perceptrons specifically. This interpretation avoids the loosening of the definition of "perceptron" to mean an artificial neuron in general.

Applications 
MLPs are useful in research for their ability to solve problems stochastically, which often allows approximate solutions for extremely complex problems like fitness approximation.

MLPs are universal function approximators as shown by Cybenko's theorem, so they can be used to create mathematical models by regression analysis. As classification is a particular case of regression when the response variable is categorical, MLPs make good classifier algorithms.

MLPs were a popular machine learning solution in the 1980s, finding applications in diverse fields such as speech recognition, image recognition, and machine translation software, but thereafter faced strong competition from much simpler (and related) support vector machines. Interest in backpropagation networks returned due to the successes of deep learning.

References

External links
 Weka: Open source data mining software with multilayer perceptron implementation.
 Neuroph Studio documentation, implements this algorithm and a few others.

Classification algorithms
Neural network architectures

de:Perzeptron#Mehrlagiges Perzeptron